The Postgraduate School of Psychology Agostino Gemelli (or ASAG) is a specializing school of Università Cattolica del Sacro Cuore. Founded in 2000, the school is situated in Via Nirone 15 in Milan, on the campus of the University. On April 26, 2009, in celebration of the fiftieth anniversary of the death of the founder of the Catholic University, was made an exhibit in the school on the tools used by Agostino Gemelli.

Master's degrees
The master's degrees offered by the school are:
Qualitative Methods Applied to Social and Marketing Research
Clinical Psychology in Medical Settings
Clinical Master in the Relationship of the Couple
Artistic Languages in Clinical Psychology
Psychogeriatrics: Clinical and Community Perspective
Family and Community Mediation
Psychological Interventions at School
Emergency Contest: the Relational Approach

References

External links
  

Università Cattolica del Sacro Cuore
Graduate schools in Italy
Universities and colleges in Milan
Psychology institutes
Educational institutions established in 2000
2000 establishments in Italy
Psychology organisations based in Italy